Pierre Corini (born 14 February 1887, date of death unknown) was an Italian racing cyclist. He rode in the 1926 Tour de France.

References

1887 births
Year of death missing
Italian male cyclists
Place of birth missing